Castillo de Belalcázar (also, castillo de los Sotomayor Zúñiga y Madróñiz, or castillo de Gahete or castillo de Gafiq) is a Gothic castle in the city of Belalcázar, province of Córdoba, southern Spain. It was established in the second half of the 15th century.

References

 Valverde Candil, Mercedes y Toledo Ortiz, Felipe. Los castillos de Córdoba. Córdoba : Asociación de Amigos de Córdoba, D.L. 1985 
 León Muñoz, Alberto. LAS FORTALEZAS DE BELALCAZAR (CORDOBA): ANALISIS ARQUEOLOGICO DE SU ARQUITECTURA (S. IX-XIX). Diputación Provincial de Córdoba.

External links

Castles in Andalusia
Bien de Interés Cultural landmarks in the Province of Córdoba (Spain)
15th-century establishments in Spain